Bengt Rolf Ingvar Bengtsson (10 April 1922 – 6 April 2001) was a Swedish middle-distance runner. He competed in the 800 m event at the 1948 Summer Olympics and 1950 European Athletics Championships and finished in fifth and fourth place, respectively. Bengtsson won the national titles in the 800 m (1948–50) and 4 × 1500 m relay (1947–49) and held a world record in the relay.

References

1922 births
2001 deaths
Swedish male middle-distance runners
Olympic athletes of Sweden
Athletes (track and field) at the 1948 Summer Olympics